In algebraic geometry, a weighted projective space P(a0,...,an) is the projective variety Proj(k[x0,...,xn]) associated to the graded ring k[x0,...,xn] where the variable xk has degree ak.

Properties

If d is a positive integer then P(a0,a1,...,an) is isomorphic to P(da0,da1,...,dan). This is a property of the Proj construction; geometrically it corresponds to the d-tuple Veronese embedding. So without loss of generality one may assume that the degrees ai have no common factor.
Suppose that a0,a1,...,an have no common factor, and that d is a common factor of all the ai with i≠j, then P(a0,a1,...,an) is isomorphic to P(a0/d,...,aj-1/d,aj,aj+1/d,...,an/d) (note that d is coprime to aj; otherwise the isomorphism does not hold). So one may further assume that any set of n variables ai have no common factor. In this case the weighted projective space is called well-formed.
The only singularities of weighted projective space are cyclic quotient singularities.
A weighted projective space is a Q-Fano variety and a toric variety.
The weighted projective space P(a0,a1,...,an)  is isomorphic to the quotient of projective space by the group that is the product of the groups of roots of unity of orders a0,a1,...,an acting diagonally.

References

Algebraic geometry